Harrie Geelen (born 10 January 1939, in Heerlen) is a Dutch illustrator, film director, animator, translator, writer and poet.  In 2014, he was made a knight in the Order of the Dutch Lion ("Ridder in de orde van de Nederlandse Leeuw").

He studied Dutch in Amsterdam, where he met his wife Imme Dros, like himself a writer of Dutch children's literature. Geelen wrote several well known television children's programs and translated Disney movies into Dutch. He illustrated his own books and those of his wife Imme Dros, some books by Annie M. G. Schmidt and a book by Toon Tellegen. He published the novel "Het Nijlpaard Ellende" and short stories like "Ooms en Tantes, Tantes en Ooms". For the movie "Pinkeltje" he was the director, designer as well as the scriptwriter. Other work include feature films and a large TV series  ("de Sommeltjes") with the use of simple computers.

A lot of his children books are published by Querido. Some of his books are published in Japan, Sweden, and France. The animated documentary about addiction "Getekende Mensen" won a "Gouden Kalf", the Dutch award for outstanding television programmes. Many documentaries made by him at Toonder Studio's won prizes in New Work and Paris.

Some of the series he worked on: 
1968 t/m 1972 - Oebele; dialogue and songs. His wife Imme  Dros attributed short stories which Geelen visualised using drawings of children 
1972 t/m 1976 - Kunt u mij de weg naar Hamelen vertellen, mijnheer?; scenario and songs
1974 and 1976 - Q & Q; scenario 
 1981 Pinkeltje - script direction and technical planning
1983 - Als je begrijpt wat ik bedoel; director of soundtrack and co-scenarist
2002 - Sommeltjes Scripts design animation direction (VPRO)"1996  Carmen  & IK - Script songs animation, design and direction (NPS)
 2003 Annetje Lie in het holst van de nacht - story adapted from the novel of Imme Dros. Script songs animation, design and direction (VPRO

References

External links

1939 births
Living people
Dutch animators
Dutch animated film directors
Dutch poets
Dutch translators
Dutch illustrators
Dutch graphic designers
Dutch screenwriters
Dutch male screenwriters
People from Heerlen
Golden Calf winners
Woutertje Pieterse Prize winners
Gouden Penseel winners